Juan Cristobal Guarello (born March 15, 1969 in Santiago) is a Chilean sports journalist. He is the son of Fernando Angel Guarello Zegers and María de Toro Serrano. He studied journalism at the Universidad Diego Portales (1988-1994). He did a diploma in film in the Pontifical Catholic University of Chile. He has worked in Chilean sports Channel 2, Rock & Pop, Chilevision, TVN, El Mercurio among other publications. He has also worked for T & C Sports.
He is currently the director of the publication El Gráfico (Chile); a sports commentator for Channel 13 and ADN Radio Chile and writes a column for the Publimetro.

Political views
From 1988 to 1994, he was a member of the Communist Party of Chile.

Books published
Juan Cristóbal Guarello has written and published 5 books in which he details the hidden history of Chilean football. 
Anecdotario del fútbol chileno (con Luis Urrutia O'Nell) (2005) 
  Historias secretas del fútbol chileno (con Luis Urrutia O'Nell) (2007)
Historias secretas del fútbol chileno II (con Luis Urrutia O'Nell) (2008)
Historia de la clasificación Sudáfrica 2010 (con Luis Urrutia O'Nell) (2010)
Anecdotario del fútbol chileno II (con Luis Urrutia O'Nell) (2011)

References 

1969 births
Living people
Chilean journalists
Male journalists
Chilean television journalists
Chilean television personalities
Diego Portales University alumni
Pontifical Catholic University of Chile alumni 
Communist Party of Chile politicians